Marc-Kevin Goellner and David Prinosil were the defending champions, but chose not to participate that year.

Henrik Holm and Anders Järryd won in the final 6–4, 7–6, against David Adams and Andrei Olhovskiy.

Seeds

  Tom Nijssen /  Cyril Suk (first round)
  Steve DeVries /  David Macpherson (first round)
  Jacco Eltingh /  Paul Haarhuis (quarterfinals)
  David Adams /  Andrei Olhovskiy (final)

Draw

Draw

References

External links
 Draw

Doubles